This is a list of the world's fastest-selling albums of recorded music. To appear on the list, the figure must have been published by a reliable source and all sales must have occurred in the first week of release. This list can contain any type of album, including studio albums, extended plays, greatest hits, compilations, various artists, soundtracks and remixes. Market order within the article is ranked alphabetically. Albums within each table are listed in order of number of copies sold and thereafter by the artist's first name.

Argentina 
This is a list of the fastest-selling albums in Argentina.

Canada 
This is a list of the fastest-selling albums in Canada since Nielsen SoundScan tracking began in 1995. 25 by Adele is the fastest-selling album of all time in Canada with over 305,928 copies sold in its first seven days of release.

Colombia 
This is a list of the fastest-selling albums in Colombia.

France 
This is a list of the fastest-selling albums in France.

Germany 
This is a list of the fastest-selling albums in Germany.

Ireland
In Ireland, the fastest-selling album is The Best of 1980–1990 by U2 in November 1998.

Japan 
This is a list of the fastest-selling albums in Japan since Oricon was founded in November 1967. The top two sales records were achieved in the same week, on March 28, 2001, as both albums were promoted as a direct competition between J-pop singer-songwriters Hikaru Utada and Ayumi Hamasaki.

Mexico 
Luis Miguel holds several of the fastest-selling albums in Mexico. His seventh studio album Cómplices sold 320,000 units in its first day alone.

New Zealand 
This is a list of the fastest-selling albums in New Zealand since the Recording Industry Association of New Zealand, later renamed as Recorded Music NZ, was founded in 1972. 25 by Adele is the fastest-selling album of all time in NZ with over 18,766 copies sold in its first seven days following release.

Spain

South Korea
This is a list of the fastest-selling albums in South Korea as recorded by the Hanteo Information System established in 1993. Map of the Soul: 7 by BTS is the fastest-selling album of all time in South Korea with 3,378,633 copies shipped to stores in its first seven days of release.

United Kingdom
This is a list of the fastest-selling albums in the United Kingdom. 25 by Adele is the fastest-selling album of all time in the UK with just over 803,000 copies sold in its first seven days.

Notes:
† Be Here Now was unconventionally released on a Thursday and debuted at number one based on three-day sales of 696,000. Sales from its first full week of availability, which went from Thursday to Wednesday were 813,000, which remains the most copies an album has sold in its first week on sale.
 The second week's sales for 25 were 439,000.
 The fifth week's sales for 25 were 450,000.

United States 
This is a list of the fastest-selling albums (pure sales) in the United States since Nielsen SoundScan tracking began on March 1, 1991. 25 by Adele is the fastest-selling album of all time in the US with 3,378,000 copies sold in its first seven days. 

 

Notes:
 I The opening number denotes sales from the first four days of availability as The Massacre was unconventionally released in the middle of the week.
 II The Eminem Show'''s release was pushed up due to bootlegging. In its first week, an unconventional week with only one day of sales, it did 284 000. The opening number denoted is the sales of the albums second week, its first full week of sales.

 Additional records 
Pre-SoundScan era
The following albums predate the introduction of Nielsen SoundScan, and are possibly subject to manipulation or inflation as sales were self-reported by record labels:

 John Fitzgerald Kennedy—A Memorial Album, recorded on the day of John F. Kennedy's assassination, sold 4 million copies at 99 cents each within six days of its release.
 In 1987, Michael Jackson's Bad sold at more than 2.25 million copies during its first week
 The Beatles' Rubber Soul sold 1,200,000 copies in "just the first nine days".
 The Beatles' self-titled double album (often known as the "White Album") sold "almost two million in one week".
 The Beatles' Let it Be allegedly had "a sale of 3,700,000 in just over 2 weeks".
 Carole King's Music reportedly sold "1,300,000 copies on the day of its release in the U.S."
 Elton John's Captain Fantastic and the Brown Dirt Cowboy, the first album to debut at number one on the Billboard 200, sold "1,400,000 in the U.S. in the first 4 days on the market".
 Led Zeppelin's In Through the Out Door allegedly sold "1,700,000 within days of release".
 Prince's Purple Rain sold 1.5 million copies in its debut week.
 In 1986, Bruce Springsteen's Live/1975–85 sold over 1.5 million copies during its first ten days.

SoundScan era
 Although not in its opening week, Whitney Houston's The Bodyguard: Original Soundtrack Album moved 1,061,000 units during Christmas week 1992.
 Although not in its opening week, the Beatles' compilation 1 moved 1,258,667 units during Christmas week 2000.
 25 by Adele sold 1.11 million and 1.16 million copies in its second and fifth weeks of availability, respectively.
 Encore'' by Eminem sold 1.58 million copies in its first ten days of availability, after an abbreviated three-day first week.

See also 
 Album era
 List of best-selling albums
 List of best-selling albums in Canada
 List of best-selling albums in Japan
 List of best-selling albums in South Korea
 List of best-selling albums in the United Kingdom
 List of best-selling albums in the United States
 List of best-selling albums in the United States of the Nielsen SoundScan era
 Lists of albums

References 

Music industry